Cordial may refer to:

Food and drink
 Liqueur, an alcoholic beverage
 Cordial (candy), a type of candy that has a liquid filling inside a chocolate shell
 Cordial (medicine), a medicinal beverage
 Squash (drink), a non-alcoholic fruit drink concentrate sometimes known as cordial
 Elderflower cordial, a non-alcoholic beverage

Other uses
 Cordial (album), an album by La Bottine Souriante
 Raspberry Cordial, a hip-hop group from Melbourne, Australia
 Lime Cordiale, a pop-rock duo from Sydney, Australia
 Cordial (restaurant), a Michelin starred restaurant in The Netherlands
 Adjectival form of "cordiality", see also agreeableness

See also